The 2015–16 Greek Basketball Cup was the 41st edition of Greece's top-tier level professional national domestic basketball cup competition. The competition started on September 29, 2015, and ended on March 6, 2016.

Format
The top six placed teams from the top-tier level Greek Basket League 2014–15 season, had an automatic bye to the quarterfinals. While the eight lower placed teams from the Greek Basket League 2014–15 season, along with the 16 teams from the 2nd-tier level Greek A2 Basket League 2015–16 season, played in preliminary rounds, competing for the other two quarterfinals places. The quarterfinals and onward rounds were played under a single elimination format.

Bracket

Quarterfinals

Semifinals

Final
This was the 12th straight Greek Cup Final appearance of Panathinaikos. Faros Keratsiniou was just the third team from the Greek 2nd Division that played in a Cup Final, after Panellinios in 1987, and Rethymno Aegean in 2007, previously accomplished the feat.

The game ended with the biggest margin between two teams in a Greek Cup Final in history. Panathinaikos broke the winning-margin record of Aris, who won 110–70 in the 1987 Greek Cup Final against Panellinios.

Awards

Most Valuable Player

Finals Top Scorer

References

External links
 Official Hellenic Basketball Federation Site 
 Official Greek Basket League Site 
 Official Greek Basket League English website 

Greek Basketball Cup
Cup